The cuneiform te sign is found in both the 14th century BC Amarna letters and the Epic of Gilgamesh; it is also notable in the Hittite language, and for that language, besides its usage as te, it is a Sumerogram (logogram or ideogram), and is used as a component in the word for "envoy", (LÚ-ȚE-mu), or LÚ-ṬE-mi, . 'Envoy' is used in the famous Hittite annals, narrating the story of Prince Zannanza who after going to Egypt to become husband (and Pharaoh) to Queen Nefertiti, was intercepted and killed.

The usage of te in the Epic of Gilgamesh, is only for syllabic or alphabetic te, 124 times.

The sign also comes in two forms, with two pairs of the left 4-signs, or one above a row of 3-signs, either group tilted, down to the right.

References

Held, Schmalstieg, Gertz, 1987. Beginning Hittite. Warren H. Held, Jr, William R. Schmalstieg, Janet E. Gertz, c. 1987, Slavica Publishers, Inc. w/ Glossaries, Sign List, Indexes, etc., 218 pages.
Moran, William L. 1987, 1992. The Amarna Letters. Johns Hopkins University Press, 1987, 1992. 393 pages.(softcover)
 Parpola, 1971. The Standard Babylonian Epic of Gilgamesh, Parpola, Simo, Neo-Assyrian Text Corpus Project, c 1997, Tablet I thru Tablet XII, Index of Names, Sign List, and Glossary-(pp. 119–145), 165 pages.
Rainey, 1970. El Amarna Tablets, 359-379, Anson F. Rainey, (AOAT 8, Alter Orient Altes Testament 8, Kevelaer and Neukirchen -Vluyen), 1970, 107 pages.

Cuneiform signs